Zuzim may refer to:
Zuzim, the plural form of Zuz (Jewish coin), a Jewish currency used in Roman Palestine
Zuzim (biblical people), a people mentioned in the Bible